Boch may refer to:

 Anna Boch (1848–1936), Belgian painter
 Cathryn Boch (born 1968), French artist
 Ernie Boch, Jr. (born 1958), American businessman
 Eugène Boch (1855–1941), Belgian painter
 François Boch (1695–1794), a founder of manufacturer Villeroy & Boch
 Hieronymus Bock (1498–1554), German herbalist
 Bureau of Cultural Heritage, a government agency in Taiwan
 Villeroy and Boch, German company

See also 
 Boche (disambiguation)